In the Catholic Church, liturgy is divine worship, the proclamation of the Gospel, and active charity. Catholic liturgies are broadly categorized as the Latin liturgical rites of the Latin Church and the Eastern Catholic liturgies of the Eastern Catholic Churches.

Liturgical principles
As explained in greater detail in the Catechism of the Catholic Church and its shorter Compendium, the liturgy is something that "the whole Christ", Head and Body, celebrates — Christ, the one High Priest, together with his Body, the Church in heaven and on earth. Involved in the heavenly liturgy are the angels and the saints of the Old Covenant and the New, in particular Mary, the Mother of God, the Apostles, the Martyrs and "a great multitude, which no man could number, out of every nation and of all tribes and peoples and tongues" (Revelation 7:9). The Church on earth, "a royal priesthood" (1 Peter 2:9), celebrates the liturgy in union with these: the baptized offering themselves as a spiritual sacrifice, the ordained ministers celebrating at the service of all the members of the Church in accordance with the order received, and bishops and priests acting in the person of Christ. The highest form of the divine worship of the liturgy is the Holy Sacrifice of the Mass, in which the one sacrifice of Christ is offered to God the Father on the altar by the priest in persona Christi in an unbloody manner, under the forms of bread and wine.

The Catholic liturgy uses signs and symbols whose significance, based on nature or culture, has been made more precise through Old Testament events and has been fully revealed in the person and life of Christ. Some of these signs and symbols come from the world of creation (light, water, fire, bread, wine, oil), others from life in society (washing, anointing, breaking bread), others from Old and New Testament sacred history (the Passover rite, sacrifice, altars, laying on of hands, the consecration of persons and objects).

These signs are closely linked with words. Though in a sense the signs speak for themselves, they need to be accompanied and vivified by the spoken word. Taken together, word and action indicate what the rite signifies and effects.

Sacraments

Sacraments in the Catholic Church are efficacious signs, perceptible to the senses, of grace. According to the Church's theology, they have been instituted by Christ and entrusted to the Church, and through them divine life is bestowed on us. They are means by which Christ gives the particular grace indicated by the sign aspect of the sacrament in question, helping the individual to advance in holiness, and contributing to the Church' s growth in charity and in giving witness. Not every individual receives every sacrament, but the Catholic Church sees the sacraments as necessary means of salvation for the faithful, conferring each sacrament's particular grace, whether forgiveness of sins, adoption as children of God, confirmation to Christ and the Church. The effect of the sacraments comes ex opere operato (by the very fact of being administered). Regardless of the personal holiness of the minister administering the sacraments, Christ provides the graces of which they are signs. However, a recipient's own lack of proper disposition to receive the grace conveyed can block their effectiveness in that person. The sacraments presuppose faith and, in addition, their words and ritual elements nourish, strengthen and give expression to faith.[Compendium of the Catechism of the Catholic Church, 224]

There are seven Sacraments:

 Baptism
 Eucharist
 Confirmation
 Penance, also called Confession and Reconciliation
 Anointing of the Sick, formerly called Extreme Unction and Last Sacraments
 Holy Orders
 Matrimony

Liturgical music
The 1967 document Musicam sacram, that implemented the Constitution on the Sacred Liturgy after the Second Vatican Council, repeatedly mentions facilitating the full, active participation of the congregation as called for by the Council. so that "unity of hearts is more profoundly achieved by the union of voices. Musicam Sacram states: "One cannot find anything more religious and more joyful in sacred celebrations than a whole congregation expressing its faith and devotion in song. Therefore the active participation of the whole people, which is shown in singing, is to be carefully promoted." It calls for fostering this congregational participation through attention to choice of song directors, to choice of songs, and to the nature of the congregation. It mentions the duty to achieve this participation on the part of choirs, choirs directors, pastors, organists, and instrumentalists. To achieve full, active participation of the congregation, great restraint in introducing new hymns has proven most helpful. To this end also, the General Instruction of the Roman Missal recommends use of seasonal responsorial psalms and also keeping to a song that all can sing while processing to Communion, to “express the communicants’ union in spirit by means of the unity of their voices, to show joy of heart, and to highlight more clearly the ‘communitarian’ nature of the procession to receive Communion.”

Devotional life of the Church

In addition to the sacraments, instituted by Christ, there are many sacramentals, sacred signs (rituals or objects) that derive their power from the prayer of the Church. They involve prayer accompanied by the sign of the cross or other signs. Important examples are blessings (by which praise is given to God and his gifts are prayed for), consecrations of persons, and dedications of objects to the worship of God.

Popular devotions are not strictly part of the liturgy, but if they are judged to be authentic, the Church encourages them. They include veneration of relics of saints, visits to sacred shrines, pilgrimages, processions (including Eucharistic processions), the Stations of the Cross (also known as the Way of the Cross), Holy Hours, Eucharistic Adoration, Benediction of the Blessed Sacrament, and the Rosary.

In its devotion the Church makes a distinction (Catechism of the Catholic Church, s2132) between respectful veneration on one hand and adoration or worship on the other. Adoration is due to God alone - this includes the Eucharist, since Christ is truly present. Veneration of an image or relic of a saint is defined as respect paid to what is represented in the image, not the image itself.

Liturgical time
Sunday, which commemorates the resurrection of Christ and has been celebrated by Christians from the earliest times (1 Corinthians 16:2; Revelation 1:10; Ignatius of Antioch: Magn.9:1; Justin Martyr: I Apology 67:5), is the outstanding occasion for the liturgy; but no day, not even any hour, is excluded from celebrating the liturgy. The sole exception is for the Eucharistic liturgy on Good Friday and on Holy Saturday before the Easter Vigil, when it is not celebrated.

The Liturgy of the Hours consecrates to God the whole course of day and night. Lauds and Vespers (morning and evening prayer) are the principal hours. To these are added one or three intermediate prayer periods (traditionally called Terce, Sext and None), another prayer period to end the day (Compline), and a special prayer period called the Office of Readings (formerly known as Matins) at no fixed time, devoted chiefly to readings from the Scriptures and ecclesiastical writers. The Second Vatican Council suppressed an additional 'hour' called Prime. The prayers of the Liturgy of the Hours consist principally of the Psalter or Book of Psalms. Like the Mass, the Liturgy of the Hours has inspired great musical compositions. An earlier name for the Liturgy of the Hours and for the books that contained the texts was the Divine Office (a name still used as the title of one English translation), the Book of Hours, and the Breviary. Bishops, priests, deacons and members of religious institutes are obliged to pray at least some parts of the Liturgy of the Hours daily, an obligation that applied also to subdeacons, until the post VCII suppression of the subdiaconate.

Sacred space
New Testament worship "in spirit and in truth" (John 4:24) is not linked exclusively with any particular place or places, since Christ is seen as the true temple of God, and through him Christians too and the whole Church become, under the influence of the Holy Spirit, a temple of God (1 Corinthians 3:16). Nevertheless, the earthly condition of the Church on earth makes it necessary to have certain places in which to celebrate the liturgy. Within these churches, chapels and oratories, Catholics put particular emphasis on the altar, the tabernacle (in which the Eucharist is kept), the seat of the bishop ('cathedra') or priest, and the baptismal font.

"The mystery of Christ is so unfathomably rich that it cannot be exhausted by its expression in any single liturgical tradition. The history of the blossoming and development of these rites witnesses to a remarkable complementarity. When the Churches lived their respective liturgical traditions in the communion of the faith and the sacraments of the faith, they enriched one another and grew in fidelity to Tradition and to the common mission of the whole Church." (CCC 1201) As catholic or universal, the Church believes it can and should hold within its unity the true riches of these peoples and cultures.

"In the liturgy, above all that of the sacraments, there is an immutable part, a part that is divinely instituted and of which the Church is the guardian, and parts that can be changed, which the Church has the power, and on occasion the duty, to adapt to the cultures of recently evangelized peoples." (CCC 1205)

Personal prayer
Likewise, the great variety of Catholic spirituality enables individual Catholics to pray privately in many different ways. The fourth and last part of the Catechism thus summarized the Catholic's response to the mystery of faith: "This mystery, then, requires that the faithful believe in it, that they celebrate it, and that they live from it in a vital and personal relationship with the living and true God. This relationship is prayer." (CCC'' 2558)

See also
 Catholic particular churches and liturgical rites

References

External links
 Dictionary of Catholic Liturgy
 Institutum Liturgicum in Anglia et Cambria
 Usuarium, A Digital Library and Database for the Study of Latin Liturgical History in the Middle Ages and Early Modern Period